Jamil Sahid Mohamed Khalil (1936 - 2000) was a Sierra Leonean-Lebanese businessman, diamonds and commodities trader. He attained prominence in the diamond industry across Africa and Antwerp and became an influential figure in the politics of Sierra Leone through his close association with President Siaka Stevens.
Jamil also came to dominate other business sectors including fisheries, tourism construction and aviation. 

In 1987, he and several prominent politicians, including Vice President Francis Minah, were implicated, convicted and sentenced to death in the failed assassination plot against President Joseph Momoh. Jamil escaped and was exiled from Sierra Leone. 

He returned to Freetown before leaving it again during the 1999 RUF invasion.

Early life
Jamil was born in Freetown in 1936 to a Sierra Leonean mother and a Lebanese father.

Career
Jamil Sahid Mohamed Khalil built his vast fortune by exporting diamonds to Antwerp during the seventies and eighties. He was arguably the most successful Lebanese trader in West Africa. As a result of his activities, he was considered one of the richest and most powerful men in Africa along with then-President Siaka Stevens.

Association with Siaka Stevens
Jamil found a kindred spirit in President Siaka Stevens who was equally keen to exploit Sierra Leone's gold and diamonds resource for personal gain.
In Sierra Leone's post-colonial era, Siaka Stevens association with Jamil Sahid Mohamed Khalil would have a dramatic effect on government policy. 
Both of them would, for a time, count themselves among Africa's wealthiest men.

The alliance of Stevens and Jamil was one of convenience. Stevens had access but as a head of state he was prohibited from engaging in commerce.

Jamil became a beneficiary of the kleptocracy established by President Siaka Stevens. His stewardship of the president's personal finances made him the second most powerful man in Sierra Leone.
Together they plunged the economy of the fledgling nation in to a state of economic chaos. Jamil encouraged Stevens to ally himself with the Lebanese merchant community who controlled a portion of the official diamond trade and also ran the majority of the unofficial diamond trade. Stevens supported illegal diamond smuggling so much so that on 3 November 1969, $3.4 million worth of the Sierra Leonean government's monthly production of diamonds vanished, allegedly at the order of Stevens and Jamil.

The president granted Jamil's National Trading Company a monopoly to import more than eighty-seven commodities. and turned a blind eye as Jamil become the foremost smuggler of the country's rare gems and minerals, raking in over $300 million. Jamil was christened the "Diamond King".

By 1971 the President had put an end to the De Beers monopoly at the request of Jamil, who had already managed to acquire 12% of the concession. By 1984 Jamil bought the remaining shares from De Beers. That marked the first time De Beers ever lost a monopoly in Africa.

Tommy Taylor-Morgan, the Minister of Finance, warned that Sierra Leone was losing in excess of US$160 million of diamond income annually to diamond smuggling. Corruption and smuggling reached such a level that official diamond production dropped significantly.

In 1985 national currency, the Leone was devalued by nearly 60 per cent and foreign exchange became scarce. Between 1968 and 1985 Stevens and Jamil successfully depleted the finances of Sierra Leone until they had rendered one of the world's biggest producers of diamonds and gold the poorest country on earth.

In a profile of Jamil, C. Magbaily Fyle in his book "Historical Dictionary of Sierra Leone," writes that "By the end of the 1970s, Jamil was influencing government and ministerial appointments, and he was dreaded, feared or admired, depending on the perceptions of the viewer."

In 1978, International Construction Company, a construction company owned by Jamil was given the contract to build a presidential residence by President Stevens Located atop Juba Hill in Freetown and spanning over 25 acres, the construction of Kabassa Lodge took two years months to complete. It was finished in time for the 1980 O.A.U. Summit.

In December 1987 Stevens was in London recovering from a stroke. He was to later learn that Jamil had not kept his side of the bargain in all the years they have been associated. In fact the house Stevens was living in, in West London was supposed to have been bought for him by Jamil Said. It turned out this was not the case. It was reported that he told Stevens, he had not put his name [Stevens] on the house to protect him. Stevens reminded him that this was two years after he had resigned from office. Stevens was reported to have confided in his grandson living with him at the house as follows: "that man has used me". "God go pay him"

The Palestine Liberation Organization connections
So great was Jamil's influence that he managed to persuade Stevens's handpicked successor, President Joseph Saidu Momoh, to invite Yasir Arafat for a state visit, at the behest of his personal friend, King Hussein of Jordan. The purpose of Arafat's visit was to secure a deal with Momoh to run a Palestinian paramilitary training camp on one of the islands off Sierra Leone's coast. Arafat offered Momoh $8 million but Momoh eventually caved to Western pressure and officially said no. Instead he permitted Jamil to keep a so-called 500 strong "personal security force" which included Palestinian exiles...

Second exile 
Jamil fled from Sierra Leone during the 1999 invasion of Freetown by the RUF rebels. One of his sons was a victim of the atrocities committed by the rebels and was shot dead, in Jamil's presence, when the rebels attacked his house in Freetown. The son was said to have taken the bullet for his father. His old friend, Lebanese Speaker, Nabih Berri arranged for him to escape to Lebanon on a diplomatic passport. Lebanon's legislature.

Jamil died of a stroke in Lebanon.

See also
Blood Diamonds
Joseph Saidu Momoh
Revolutionary United Front
Siaka Stevens
Sierra Leone
Antwerp

References

Further reading
Child Soldiers, Adult Interests: The Global Dimensions of the Sierra Leonean Tragedy by J. Peter Pham, Ph.D.
Blood from Stones: The Secret Financial Network of Terror by Douglas Farah

External links
War and Peace in Sierra Leone: Diamonds, Corruption and the Lebanese Connection
Sierra Leone: the world's poorest nation by Elizabeth Vidler, Contemporary Review, January 1993

1936 births
Sierra Leonean prisoners sentenced to death
People from Freetown
Sierra Leonean businesspeople
Lebanese businesspeople
Living people
Blood diamonds
Politics of Sierra Leone
Sierra Leonean people of Lebanese descent